Edwin W. Shaar (January 1, 1915 – April 26, 2001) was an American writer, graphic artist and typeface designer.  He was an assistant art director at Lanston Monotype before becoming director of the type design program at Intertype.  He also designed Phototypesetting faces.

Typefaces
Shaar designed all of these foundry types:

Shaar also designed these fotofonts:

References

American typographers and type designers
1915 births
American artists
2001 deaths